Old St. Raymond's Church is a historic church in Dublin, California.  The building was placed on the National Register of Historic Places on April 12, 2006.

The oldest extant Catholic church in Alameda and Contra Costa counties, it was built in 1859 and dedicated in 1860. Jeremiah donated $30 in cash toward the church's construction costs.

The church features simple Gothic Revival design and a New England-style white clapboard  exterior along with nicked wooden benches and wide-plank redwood floors.    It was constructed by the Murray and Fallon families, Irish immigrants from Elphin, County Roscommon.  The families left Ireland before the Great Famine and lived in New York City before joining early wagon trains to the west—including the Donner Party.  But both families parted from the Donner Party at Fort Bridger,  Wyoming. Wood for the chapel came from the nearby Oakland hills; the logs were hauled by oxen and milled in Dublin. During construction of the church, pioneer Tom Donlon fell to his death on September 6, 1859. He was the first to be formally buried in the Dublin Pioneer Cemetery.

Originally a mission church, the local residents were unable to afford a full-time priest so a member of the Oakland clergy would ride to St. Raymond's once a month by mule to offer Mass.  Later the church came under St. Leander's Church in San Leandro, then St. Michael's in Livermore and finally, in 1961 it came within the jurisdiction of St. Augustine's in Pleasanton. It held its first wedding in 1865 between Ellen Fallon (daughter of Jeremiah) and William Tehan.  The belfry was first added in 1880.  In 1966, the church moved to a new, much larger location (also named St. Raymond's Church) and the Oakland Diocese gave the old church to Amador-Livermore Valley Historical Society (ALVHS) to be preserved and restored.  ALVHS put the building to many uses, then sold the church to the City of Dublin in 1993.  The city was also able to acquire the adjacent Old Murray Schoolhouse and the Dublin Pioneer Cemetery to set up an area deemed the Dublin Heritage Center.  The City of Dublin rents the building out for community and private use.

The first recorded renovation of Old St. Raymond's Church was 1922, and the most recent soon after the city took possession of the structure.  The church's general appearance has remained unchanged since its construction in 1859.  Through private donations, a new bell tower was constructed; in 1967 the church's restoration was complete.

See also
 Dublin Pioneer Cemetery – established behind the church. The first burial there is of a worker who fell to his death while building the church.

References

External links
 Parish website
 History of St. Raymond Catholic Parish
 City of Dublin's page for the venue
 Dublin Heritage Center website 
 

Carpenter Gothic church buildings in California
Roman Catholic churches completed in 1859
19th-century Roman Catholic church buildings in the United States
Roman Catholic churches in California
Churches on the National Register of Historic Places in California
Churches in Alameda County, California
Dublin, California
National Register of Historic Places in Alameda County, California